Aisha Praught-Leer (born 14 December 1989 in Moline, Illinois) is a middle-distance runner from Illinois competing for Jamaica. She attended Woodrow Wilson Middle School and Moline High School. Praught competed in Athletics at the 2016 Summer Olympics after running the 1500 meters and steeplechase standards in 2015. Praught competed in the Women's 3000 metres steeplechase event at the 2015 World Championships in Athletics in Beijing, China, but was disqualified. She was the gold medalist in the steeplechase at the 2018 Commonwealth Games.

Biography
Although raised by two white American parents, Aisha's biological father is a Jamaican reggae musician with whom her mother had a relationship for several years. The relationship ended after Aisha's mother returned to the United States to give birth. She married her current husband four years after Aisha's birth. In 2013, Aisha travelled to Germany to meet her birth father for the first time. She then decided to represent Jamaica to honor her heritage.
She married professional runner Will Leer in 2016.

2016 Olympics
In the steeplechase at the 2016 Olympics, Praught was involved in an incident that also left Etenesh Diro and Sara Louise Treacy lying on the track.  All three athletes were advanced to the final, where Praught beat Diro to finish in 14th place.

Competition record

1Disqualified in the final

Personal records
 1500 m: 4:04.95 
 3000 m: 8:41.10
 5000 m: 15:07.5
 3000 m steeplechase: 9:14.09

See also
 Jamaica at the 2015 World Championships in Athletics

References

External links
 
 
 
 
 
 Aisha Praught at the 2019 Pan American Games
 
 

1989 births
Living people
Track and field athletes from Illinois
American female middle-distance runners
American female steeplechase runners
Jamaican female middle-distance runners
Jamaican female steeplechase runners
Olympic female steeplechase runners
Olympic athletes of Jamaica
Athletes (track and field) at the 2016 Summer Olympics
Athletes (track and field) at the 2020 Summer Olympics
Commonwealth Games gold medallists for Jamaica
Commonwealth Games medallists in athletics
Athletes (track and field) at the 2018 Commonwealth Games
World Athletics Championships athletes for Jamaica
Jamaican people of American descent
American people of Jamaican descent
Athletes (track and field) at the 2019 Pan American Games
Pan American Games silver medalists for Jamaica
Pan American Games medalists in athletics (track and field)
Commonwealth Games gold medallists in athletics
Medalists at the 2019 Pan American Games
Medallists at the 2018 Commonwealth Games